My Brothers and I is a 2021 French drama film directed by Yohan Manca. In June 2021, the film was selected to compete in the Un Certain Regard section at the 2021 Cannes Film Festival.

Release
The film was released in theaters on 5 January 2022. It earned $329,106 from 185 theaters in its opening weekend.

Cast
 Maël Rouin Berrandou as Nour
 Judith Chemla as Sarah
 Dali Benssalah as Abel
  as Mo

References

External links
 

2021 films
2021 drama films
French drama films
Hood films
2020s French-language films
2020s American films
2020s French films